Harpalus chobautianus is a species of ground beetle in the subfamily Harpalinae. It was described by Lutshnik in 1922.

References

chobautianus
Beetles described in 1922